Mk IV helmet is a combat helmet that was used by the British Army in the 1950s to 1980s.

It replaced the Mk III helmet and became the British Army's last metal helmet when it was replaced by the composite material Mk 6 helmet in 1985.

Design
The Mark IV helmet was a modified design of the Mk III helmet with the chinstrap rivet moved down the bottom of the helmet shell as well as the introduction of a lift the dot style 
fastener for the inner liner.

References

External links

 Mk IV helmet at world-war-helmets.com

Combat helmets of the United Kingdom
Cold War military equipment of the United Kingdom
British Army equipment
Military equipment introduced in the 1950s